Prior to 1944, Iran was not served by a United States ambassador; instead, a diplomatic minister was sent. The first ambassador was named in 1944.

After the Iran hostage crisis in 1979, the United States terminated diplomatic relations with the Iranian government, therefore no ambassadors have since been appointed. The United States government has since then been represented in Iran by the United States Interests Section of the Embassy of Switzerland in Tehran.

List of Ambassadors
This is a list of United States ambassadors and other heads of diplomatic missions to Iran.

Iran
Henry Harris Jessup - nominated for Chargé d'Affaires but withdrawn before approval
Samuel G. W. Benjamin (1883–1885) - first Chargé d'Affaires, but promoted to Minister Resident almost immediately
Bayless W. Hanna (1885) - Minister Resident - took oath of office but did not go to Persia
Frederick H. Winston (1885–1886) - Minister Resident
E. Spencer Pratt (1886–1891) - Minister Resident
Truxtun Beale (1891–1892) - Minister Resident
Watson R. Sperry (1892–1893) - Minister Resident
Alexander McDonald (1893–1897) - Minister Plenipotentiary, later Minister Resident
Arthur S. Hardy (1897–1899) - Minister Resident
William P. Lord (1899) - would have been Minister Resident, but declined appointment
Herbert W. Bowen (1899–1901) - Minister Resident
Lloyd C. Griscom (1901–1902) - Minister Plenipotentiary
Richmond Pearson (1902–1907) - Minister Plenipotentiary
John Brinkerhoff Jackson (1907–1909) - Minister Plenipotentiary
Charles Wells Russell Jr. (1909–1914) - Minister Plenipotentiary
John L. Caldwell (1914–1921) - Minister Plenipotentiary
Joseph Saul Kornfeld (1921–1924) - Minister Plenipotentiary
Hoffman Philip (1925–1928) - Minister Plenipotentiary
Charles C. Hart (1929–1933) - Minister Plenipotentiary, last envoy accredited to "Persia"
William H. Hornibrook (1934–1936) - Minister Plenipotentiary
Gordon P. Merriam (1936–1937) - Chargé d'Affaires
Cornelius Van H. Engert (1937–1940) - Chargé d'Affaires
Louis G. Dreyfus Jr. (1940–1943) - Minister Plenipotentiary
Leland B. Morris (1944–1945) - First ambassador
Wallace Murray (1945–1946)
George V. Allen (1946–1948)
John C. Wiley (1948–1950)
Henry F. Grady (1950–1951)
Loy W. Henderson (1951–1954)
Julius C. Holmes - nominated, but nomination withdrawn before approved
Selden Chapin (1955–1958)
Edward T. Wailes (1958–1961)
Julius C. Holmes (1961–1965)
Armin H. Meyer (1965–1969)
Douglas MacArthur II (1969–1972)
Joseph S. Farland (1972–1973)
Richard Helms (1973–1977)
William H. Sullivan (1977–1979)
Walter L. Cutler - nominated, but rejected by Iran
Bruce Laingen (1979) - Chargé d'Affaires, seized with the embassy on November 4, 1979. He was later released.

See also
Embassy of the United States, Tehran
Iran–United States relations
Foreign relations of Iran
Ambassadors of the United States
American School in Tehran

References
United States Department of State: Background notes on Iran

External links
 United States Department of State: Chiefs of Mission for Iran
 United States Department of State: Iran

Iran
 
20th century in Iran
United States